Paytm (acronym for "pay through mobile") is an Indian multinational financial technology company, that specializes in digital payments and financial services, based in Noida. It was founded in 2010 by Vijay Shekhar Sharma under One97 Communications. The company offers mobile payment services to consumers and enables merchants to receive payments through its QR code, point of sale and online payment gateway offerings. In partnership with financial institutions, Paytm offers financial services such as microloans and buy now, pay later to its consumers and merchants. Apart from bill payments and money transfer, the company also provides ticketing services, retail brokerage products and online games.

Paytm's parent company, One97 Communications, got listed on the Indian stock exchanges on 18 November 2021 after an initial public offering, which was the largest in India at the time. For the fiscal year 2021–22, Paytm's gross merchandise value (GMV) was reported to be .

History
It started off as a prepaid mobile and DTH recharge platform, and later added data card, postpaid mobile and landline bill payments in 2013.

In October 2011, Sapphire Ventures (fka SAP Ventures) invested $10 million in One97 Communications Ltd. By January 2014, the company had launched the Paytm Wallet, which the Indian Railways and Uber added as a payment option. It launched into e-commerce with online deals and bus ticketing. In 2015, it added education fees, metro recharges, electricity, gas, and water bill payments. Paytm's registered user base grew from 1.18 crore in August 2014 to 10.4 crore in August 2015. Its travel business crossed $500 million in annualised GMV run rate, with 20 lakh tickets booked per month.

In March 2015, Paytm received its huge stake from Chinese e-commerce company Alibaba Group, after Ant Financial Services Group, an Alibaba Group affiliate, took 40% stock in Paytm as part of a strategic agreement. Soon after, it received backing from Ratan Tata, the MD of Tata Sons. In August 2016, Paytm raised funding from Mountain Capital, one of Taiwan-based MediaTek's investment funds at a valuation of over $5 billion. Also in 2016, it launched movies, events and amusement parks ticketing as well as flight ticket bookings and Paytm QR. Later that year, it launched rail bookings and gift cards.

In May 2017, Paytm received its biggest round of stake by a single investor – SoftBank, thus bringing the company's valuation to an estimated $10 billion. In August 2018, Berkshire Hathaway invested $356 million for 3%- 4% stake in Paytm, although Berkshire Hathaway confirmed that Warren Buffett was not involved in the transaction.

In 2017, it became India's first payment app to cross over 10 crore app downloads. The same year, it launched Paytm Gold, a product that allowed users to buy as little as ₹1 of pure gold online. It also launched Paytm Payments Bank and ‘Inbox’, a messaging platform with in-chat payments. By 2018, it started allowing merchants to accept Paytm, UPI and card payments directly into their bank accounts at 0% charge.) It also launched the ‘Paytm for Business’ app (now called Business with Paytm App), allowing merchants to track their payments and day-to-day settlements. Its merchant base to grow to more than 70 lakh by March 2018. It launched two new wealth management products - Paytm Gold Savings Plan and Gold Gifting for long-term savings. In January 2018, it entered into a joint venture with Alibaba Group-owned gaming company AGTech Holdings to launch Gamepind, a mobile gaming platform. It was rebranded as Paytm First Games in June 2019. In March 2018, Paytm Money was started with an investment of ₹9 crore for investment and wealth management.

In March 2019, the firm launched a subscription based loyalty program called Paytm First, and in May 2019, it partnered with Citibank to launch Paytm First credit card On 25 November 2019, Paytm raised $1 billion in a funding round led by US asset manager T Rowe Price along with existing investors Ant Financial and SoftBank Vision Fund. In July 2020, Tata Starbucks partnered with Paytm allowing its customers to order food online during the COVID-19 pandemic.

In July 2021, One97 Communications filed a draft red herring prospectus with the Securities and Exchange Board of India to launch its initial public offering (IPO). It launched its IPO in November 2021, raising  at a valuation of 20 billion. It was the largest ever IPO in India. The shares began trading on 18 November 2021, opening at 1,950 on the NSE, 9.3% below the upper band of the IPO price range, and closed down more than 27% at 1,560, making it the biggest drop on a listing day in Indian IPO history.

In December 2021, Paytm launched Paytm Wealth Academy.

Funding and shareholding 

Post-IPO shareholding (as of June 2022):

Investments and acquisitions 
In 2013, Paytm acquired Plustxt for under $2 million. Plustxt was started by IT graduates Pratyush Prasanna, Parag Arora, Lokesh Chauhan and Lohit V that allowed fast text messaging in any Indian language.

Paytm invested $5 million in auto-rickshaw aggregator and hyperlocal delivery firm Jugnoo in 2015. It also acquired Delhi-based consumer behaviour prediction platform Shifu and local services startup Near.in. In 2016, it invested in logistics startups LogiNext and XpressBees. Healthcare startup QorQL, which uses artificial intelligence (AI) and big data to assist medical care, received investment from Paytm in April 2017  In July 2017, it acquired a majority stake in online ticketing and events platform Insider.in, backed by event management company Only Much Louder (OML) and mobile loyalty startup MobiQuest. It also acquired Little and nearbuy.com during 2017. an India-based, hyper-local eCommerce company.In December 2017, nearbuy.com merged with Little App, while raising fresh capital from Paytm. As part of the deal, the competitor companies would merge under the leadership of co-founder and CEO Ankur Warikoo, while Paytm would acquire majority ownership of the merged entity.

The company acquired the startup Cube26 in January 2018  and hotel booking platform NightStay in 2019.

Paytm board has approved a resolution which would allot 47,042 equity shares to 60 employees under its ESOP Scheme 2008 and ESOP Scheme 2019.

In October 2021, Paytm acquired digital lending company CreditMate.

International expansion

Japan 

Paytm established a joint venture with SoftBank and Yahoo Japan, called PayPay Corporation, to offer services in the Japanese market. Paytm launched the PayPay app, a QR-based payment settlement service, in Japan on 22 October 2018.

Canada 
Paytm Labs Inc. was established in Toronto, Ontario in 2014 as a research and development division. It recently launched a fraud risk management platform called Pi for fintechs and digital marketplaces where transaction value is high.

Paytm Insider 
Paytm Insider is a mobile app that helps to book tickets for Cricket matches, live entertainment shows and sports games online.

Controversies 
California-based PayPal filed a case against Paytm in the Indian trademark office for using a logo with a similar colour combination to its own on 18 November 2016.

In May 2018, the Indian investigative news agency Cobrapost released a video of an undercover reporter meeting with Paytm's vice president, Ajay Shekhar Sharma who is the brother of Vijay Shekhar Sharma. During the meeting, he reportedly said the company had provided the Indian Government with the personal data of Paytm users in the Indian state of Jammu and Kashmir, violating user's privacy and policies. Later, BuzzFeed reported that, Sharma has close ties with India's ruling party Bhartiya Janata Party. Meanwhile, in response, the company tweeted that, it had never shared user's data with third parties, denied the contents in the video, and stated that it had never received requests from law enforcement on Twitter. Paytm also stated that any person claiming otherwise "is not aware of the policy and is not authorised to speak on behalf of the company".

Paytm has alleged that the Indian telecom companies are not blocking numbers used for phishing activities and sued them for ₹100 crores in the Delhi High Court 

On 18 September 2020, the firm's official app was briefly unlisted from the Google Play Store allegedly due to violations of the Play Store's gambling policy. The company claimed that Google did not offer any prior warning or give the company an opportunity to explain its views on the contentious 'cashback' offers while claiming that Google's own payments app Google Pay offered similar 'cashback' offers and suffered no repercussions.

In March 2022, the Reserve Bank of India barred Paytm Payments Bank from signing up new customers after an inspection found that the company was leaking customer data to China-based entities which indirectly owned a stake in Paytm Payments Bank.

Charity 
During the COVID-19 pandemic in India, Paytm contributed 10 to every single user who pays to the PM CARES fund via their app; within ten days they had collected 100 crores in their app. Their 1,200 employees contributed 15 days or even a few months of their salaries to the fund.

Through their platform, Paytm made 21,000 oxygen concentrators available for people in need, and donated oxygen plants in 13 worst-hit cities to help hospitals get oxygen.

In August 2022, Paytm Foundation partnered with United Nations Environment Program (UNEP) to set up the Air Quality Action Forum (AQAF) to curb air pollution in India.

Awards and recognition 
 Paytm won the award for Best UPI App, Most Design User-friendly Fintech App and the Most Innovative Use of Technology at Global Fintech Fest 2022
 The Divide: A Social Experiment by Paytm won at the ET Brand Equity Spott Awards 2022 under Social Awareness through Short film/Videos category 
 Paytm won the Best Unicorn title at BW Businessworld Unicorn Summit and Awards 2022 
 At the Rural and Urban Development Summit and Awards 2022 presented by the Minister of State for Ministry of Housing and Urban Affairs, Government of India, Paytm won the awards for Most Trusted Brand of the Year and Paytm Soundbox won the award for Best IoT Solution of the Year.
 Paytm was recognised as the 'Employer of the Future' by Fortune India magazine 
 It won the IAMAI's India Digital Award 2021 for Best FinTech Growth Story by the Internet and Mobile Association of India.
 It was conferred Outstanding Startup of the Year Award at Forbes Leadership Awards 2016.
 Paytm was awarded the FT Future of Fintech Awards by the Financial Times in 2016.
 Paytm was announced as the finalist of the Meffys Awards 2015 under the mobile money category.
 It won the MMA Smarties Award Gold for Mobile App & Silver for mCommerce by the Mobile Marketing Association in 2014.

See also 

PhonePe

References

External links 
 Official website

Indian companies established in 2010
Financial services companies established in 2010
Internet properties established in 2010
2010 establishments in Uttar Pradesh
Companies based in Noida
E-commerce in India
Mobile payments in India
Indian brands
Online payments
Payment service providers
Softbank portfolio companies
Super-apps
Payments banks
2021 initial public offerings
Mobile payments
Companies listed on the Bombay Stock Exchange
Companies listed on the National Stock Exchange of India
Retail companies established in 2010
Online retailers of India